Brooklyn F.C. may refer to:

Brooklyn Field Club, a defunct soccer club which played in the National Association Football League
Brooklyn F.C. (Dublin), a defunct Irish football club
Brooklyn F.C. (New York), a defunct American Soccer League club